Compsibidion amantei is a species of beetle in the family Cerambycidae. It was described by Brazilian entomologist Ubirajara Martins in 1960.

References

Compsibidion
Beetles described in 1960